Here is a listing of several television stations in Uganda:

Uganda Broadcasting Corporation – Uganda Television State operated, with one national service.
NBS Television – Owned by Next Media.
BBS Terefayina – Buganda Broadcasting Services owned by Buganda Kingdom.
Channel U - exclusive on Azam Tv it's an easy Africa channel .

LTV-Lighthouse TV/TBN Uganda – Kampala UG.. Christian
Bukedde TV (Bukedde 1 and Bukedde 2)
Top TV
Channel 44
Urban TV
NTV Uganda.
ABS Television
Baba TV – Running programmes in Lusoga, Luganda and English
TV West – Broadcasting in Lunyankole
Dream TV
Delta TV
STV
Sanyuka TV
Salt Media

Regional TVs

Luo TV - Broadcasting in Luo language

East African Television

KBC – Kenya Broadcasting Corporation
TBC – Tanzania Broadcasting Corporation
Citizen TV Kenya
Channel 10
TV Africa

References

 
Uganda